Brandon Stephens may refer to:

 Brandon Stephens (American football, born 1987), American AFL cornerback, currently a free agent
 Brandon Stephens (American football, born 1997), American NFL cornerback, currently playing for the Baltimore Ravens